Phoenix (stylised as ) is a German free-to-air television channel which is operated jointly by public-service broadcasters ARD and ZDF. It broadcasts documentaries, news, special events coverage and discussion programmes. Phoenix's headquarters are in Bonn, the former West German capital.

On November 15th 2022, Phoenix closed its SDTV feed across its cable and satellite feeds, but the SD feed can still be received via an antenna.

Programming

Phoenix broadcasts a deaf-subtitled version of the Tagesschau, ARD's flagship news broadcast, and ZDF's premier news broadcast Heute-Journal, in German Sign Language.

The channel's flagship news broadcast is Der Tag ("The Day"), which airs from 11:00 pm to midnight. Its length enables extended reports and interviews to be included.

The show Vor Ort ("On Scene") includes live coverage of political events, public lectures by important personalities, press conferences and assemblies of the Bundestag and Bundesrat.

Daily talk shows like Phoenix Runde (Phoenix Roundtable) with Alexander Kähler, Unter den Linden with Michaela Kolster or Michael Hirz, discuss current topics with experts or politicians.

As a benchmark in coverage, a "Meet the Press"-like show, Internationaler Frühschoppen is broadcast Sunday at 12 noon when the ARD's Presseclub is not broadcast.

The series "Historische Debatten" ("Historical Debates") and "Historische Ereignisse" ("Historical Events"), with journalist Helmut Illert, examine important topics relating to the development of the Federal Republic of Germany.

Phoenix is comparable to the American channel C-SPAN or the British BBC Parliament, because they also cover government and national politics.

Creation

The creation of Phoenix is credited to the former chancellor Helmut Kohl, who wanted to create a "European Parliamentary Channel". However, the idea was rejected due to criticism by the public channels (ARD and ZDF) and suspicion that political pressure from Kohl could lead to a "Helmut-Kohl-Channel".

The real idea for "Phoenix - Der Ereignis- und Dokumentationskanal" ("Phoenix - the current affairs and documentary channel") came from viewers of ARD and ZDF, who wanted a "media-political correction of faults in the system of information transfer". This created the opportunity to create a "Parliamentary Channel", with the aim of increasing credibility and satisfying consumer demand.

Private channels (RTL and Sat. 1) criticized the creation of Phoenix because they were at the time creating their own news channels (n-tv and N24 respectively).

The headquarters of Phoenix were provisionally situated in Cologne. However, in 2000, the headquarters were relocated to studios in Bonn.

Phoenix's highest ratings to date were in August 2006, when it had 1.0% viewer share. With about 4.5 million viewers, it had more viewers than N-TV and N24.

Alignment of programming 

Phoenix's stated aim is it to create "balance of the shortening of information, which are seen in news and magazines on television". The programming should be a "truthful illustration of the reality in correspondence with the constitutional order of the funded broadcast and television stations in Germany". The target is fulfilled with current reportages and documentaries from the vast archive of ARD and ZDF, as well as international productions from Discovery Channel and the BBC, dubbed into German.

Logo history

Audience share

Germany

References

External links

 Official site
 DWDL.de: „10 Jahre Phoenix - Von schwarzen Koffern bis zum Papst“

ARD (broadcaster)
ZDF
Legislature broadcasters
Television channels and stations established in 1997
1997 establishments in Germany
Mass media in Bonn
24-hour television news channels in Germany
German-language television stations